Maureen Magreth Hinda-Mbuende (born 9 September 1964 at Tses in ǁKaras Region ) is a Namibian legislator in the National Assembly and a politician serving as a deputy minister of Finance and Public Enterprises.

Education and early career 
Hinda-Mbuende matriculated at Suiderlig High School in 1983. She completed her B.Com. Hons in Business Administration from the University of Western Cape in 2002.  In 1990 Hinda-Mbuende worked as school teacher at Fredrick Awaseb School. She later served at UN Volunteers as an Administration Assistant Finance. From 1994 to 1996 she worked as an Internal Audit Clerk at  City Savings and Investment Bank. She had been a regional manager at Namibia Housing Enterprise (NHE) in 2002–2009. Hinda-Mbuende left NHE in 2009 to become a managing director at the South Cross HCM Center before she was appointed to be a deputy minister in 2015.

Political career 
Hinda-Mbuende has been a member of the National Assembly since 2015. In March 2015  Hinda-Mbuende was first  appointed by President  Hage Geingob as a deputy minister of International Relations and Cooperation. In February 2018 she was then appointed to a ministry of Home Affairs, Immigration Safety and Security as a deputy minister. On 21 April 2021 Hinda-Mbuende was again appointed as deputy minister of Finance and Public Enterprises.

References

External links
Profile at Parliament of Namibia

Government ministers of Namibia
Women government ministers of Namibia
1964 births
Living people
University of the Western Cape alumni
Women members of the National Assembly (Namibia)
SWAPO politicians
People from ǁKaras Region